Eldar Shengelaia (born 26 January 1933) is a Georgian and Soviet film director and screenwriter who directed ten films between 1957 and 1996. From 1990 to 2004, he was a member of the Parliament of Georgia. He has been awarded the titles of the People's Artist of Georgia (1979) and of the Soviet Union (1988). He has been a chairman of the Film-makers' Union of Georgia since 1976. Since 2008, he has been chairman of the State Council of Heraldry at the Parliament of Georgia.

Cinema career
Eldar Shengelia was born in Tbilisi, the capital of then-Soviet Georgia into the family of the film director Nikoloz Shengelaia and actress Nato Vachnadze. His brother, Giorgi Shengelaia is also a film director.

He graduated from the All-Union State Institute of Cinematography in Moscow in 1958 and then worked for the Mosfilm studio. In 1960, he became a director at the Tbilisi-based Gruziya-film studio. In 1969, Shengelaia gained nationwide acclaim with the satyrical tragicomedy Arachveulebrivi gamopena ("An Unusual Exhibition") socio-political allusions of which caused discontent in the official Soviet cinema establishment. Since then, Shengelaia has retained a reputation of a highly individual filmmaker.

Shengelaia produced another high-profile tragicomedy about inept bureaucracy Tsisperi mtebi anu daujerebeli ambavi ("Blue Mountains, or Unbelievable Story"), one of the best achievements in the Soviet "social fiction" genre. It won the All-Union Film Festival Prize in 1984 and the USSR State Prize in 1985. After a major success in the 1980s, Eldar Shengelaia distanced himself from the cinema and became involved in the Georgian independence movement which gained a momentum in 1989. In the 1990s, Shengelaia briefly returned to the cinema and produced two films which were positively received by critics but did not attract a broader public attention.

In 1985 he was a member of the jury at the 14th Moscow International Film Festival. In 1992 he was a member of the jury at the 42nd Berlin International Film Festival.

Political career
From 1980 to 1985 and from 1989 to 1990, Shengelaia, then a Communist party member, was elected to the Georgian SSR Supreme Soviet and, from 1989 to 1991, to the Congress of the People’s Deputies of the USSR. He was a member of the Sobchak commission, investigating into the Soviet military crackdown on pro-independence rally in Tbilisi, for which he produced a resonant documentary film. In July 1989, Shengelaia became a founding member of the People’s Front of Georgia, a pro-independence party, and emerged as a leader of its moderate wing. In October 1990, he was elected to the Supreme Council of Georgia in the first multi-party elections in Soviet Georgia and was a signatory to the Act of Independence of Georgia in April 1991. Afterwards, he was in opposition to the Zviad Gamsakhurdia government following whose overthrow in a military coup in January 1992, Shengelaia joined the Eduard Shevardnadze-led State Council of Georgia. In 1992, he became a member of parliament where he held a post of vice-speaker since 1995. He allied, in May 1993, with the pro-Shevardnadze civil movement Unity and Prosperity founded by several high-profile intellectuals.

In 1994, Shengelaia became a founding member of the Union of Citizens of Georgia chaired by Shevardnadze and joined its "reformist" faction led by Zurab Zhvania whom he joined in opposition to Shevardnadze in 2002. In response, Shevradnadze’s loyal members of parliament tried, unsuccessfully, to have Shengelaia removed from the vice-speaker’s position in May 2002. In 2003, he supported the Rose Revolution which ousted Shevardnadze and was reelected to the Parliament of Georgia in 2004 on the National Movement-Democrats alliance ticket. Later that year, he retired from active politics. In 2008, he was appointed a chairman of the State Council of Heraldry.

On 12 April 2009, Shengelaia was awarded St. George's Order of Victory, one of the highest civic awards of Georgia, for "having participating in the investigation of and having shown to the world the truth" about 9 April 1989 events in Tbilisi.

Filmography
 Well (2020)
 A Chair (2016)
 Dog Rose (1996)
 Express  Information (1993)
 Blue Mountains, or Unbelievable Story (1983)
 Samanishvili's Stepmother (1977)
 The Eccentrics (1973)
 Extraordinary Exhibition (1968)
 Miqela (1965)
 The White Caravan (1963)
 A Snow Fairy Tale (1959)
 Legend of the Ice Heart (1957)

References

External links

1933 births
Living people
Film people from Tbilisi
Mingrelians
Communist Party of Georgia (Soviet Union) politicians
United National Movement (Georgia) politicians
Film directors from Georgia (country)
Screenwriters from Georgia (country)
Soviet film directors
Soviet screenwriters
Male screenwriters
People's Artists of Georgia
People's Artists of the USSR
Recipients of the USSR State Prize
Gerasimov Institute of Cinematography alumni
Recipients of St. George's Order of Victory
Recipients of the Presidential Order of Excellence